WMPN may refer to:

 WMPN-FM, a radio station (91.3 FM) licensed to Jackson, Mississippi, United States
 WMPN-TV, a television station (channel 29) licensed to Jackson, Mississippi, United States